Uíge is one of the eighteen Provinces of Angola, located in the northwestern part of  the country. Its capital city is of the same name.

History
During the Middle Ages, the Uíge Province was the heartland of the Kongo Kingdom. The Bakongo North and South of the Kongo river were all part of this Kingdom, a centralized monarchy which for given periods of time also dominated part of the Ambundu further to the South. The kings lived in the city of M'banza-Kongo which had a population of about 50,000 in the 16th century. Knowledge of metallurgy among the Bakongo was renowned; their king was even called the “Blacksmith King”. Their reign was first strengthened by the arrival Portuguese priests who lived at the king's court and taught religion as well as literacy; the interaction with the Portuguese stronghold of Luanda was rather marginal for a long time. Things changed when the Portuguese started to conquer and occupy the hinterland in the 19th century. In the beginning of the 20th century, the Kongo kingdom still existed on paper and the court in M'banza-Kongo was maintained, but had lost any effective power.

In the early part of 20th century the province was on a decline due to its inhospitable terrain and poor accessibility. The situation changed entirely when the Portuguese discovered that soil and climate were favourable to coffee production. The Uíge province (then called "district") became Angola's major centre for coffee production in the 1950s. While part of the production came from European (mostly Portuguese) owned plantations, most producers were Bakongo smallholders; in both cased, they relied on forced or "contract" labour from the Ovimbundu. Its market centre of Uíge town, the district capital, prospered and was designated a city in 1956. To encourage the principle of national integration with Portugal, many towns in Angola were renamed during Portuguese colonial rule, including the provincial capital of Uíge town, which was renamed Vila Marechal Carmona after Marshal Óscar Carmona, the former President of Portugal, later simplified as Carmona.

In the 1950s, the Bakongo people were among the forerunners in the independence movement. For part of them, the purpose was to restore their kingdom, but their majority came out in favour of Angola as a whole. They  formed first a regional movement, União das Populações do Norte de Angola (union of the people of Northern Angola), then baptized União das Populações de Angola (union of Angolan peoples), and finally the National Front for the Liberation of Angola (Frente Nacional de Libertação de Angola; FNLA), which became one of the three Angolan anti-colonial guerrilla movements fighting the Portuguese forces, during the 1960s.

During the Portuguese rule, the province, and in particular its capital Uíge, became the haven of rebel activity (its inaccessible wilderness providing the cover for such activity) of the rebels received active support from the leader of its neighbouring country of Congo, Mobutu Sese Seko. Rebels of the  União Nacional para a Independência Total de Angola (UNITA) had even occupied the province for short spells during renewed civil war in 1990s. It was only in 2002 there was peace in the region.

Beginning in October 2004 and continuing into 2005, Uíge Province was the centre of an outbreak of Marburg hemorrhagic fever, a disease closely related to Ebola. It was caused by Marburg virus which is an African RNA virus that causes green monkey disease. Now thought to be under control, there were 374 cases with 88% deaths. According to the United Nations, it was, at the time, the world's worst epidemic of any kind of hemorrhagic fever.

Geography
Uíge Province is located in northeastern Angola.  It is bounded on the north by the Democratic Republic of Congo, on the west by the Zadi River, east by the Beu river and on the south by Beu town. The land route to enter the province is from Luanda through the province of Bengo. Roads are being built over the hilly terrain to connect with Congo. The main road in the north is the one which crosses the border at Kizenga to reach Kinshasa. A highway connects to Castilo and further on to Luanda. Another southwest highway connects with the provinces of Zaire and Malanje.

The province is drained by many rivers. Cuilo river flows is a popular attraction, as is the Sanza Pombo falls. The lagoon of Luzamba and Muvoio and the lagoon of Sacapate are good for swimming and bathing. Other important rivers in the province are the Zadi River, the Lucala River, the Dange River and the Luvulu River. Only small boats can ply these rivers. It is bounded on the north by the Democratic Republic of Congo, on the west by the Zadi, east by the Beu River and on the south by Beu town. Since the Forest Reserve near Beu village is not declared the assistance provided to  maintain it is lacking. Hence, the reserve has poor infrastructure and guidance. Among the large mammals, elephants could be sighted here.

Municipalities
The province of Uíge contains sixteen municipalities:

 Alto Cauale
 Ambuila
 Bembe
 Buengas
 Bungo
 Damba
 Maquela do Zombo (Zombo)
 Milunga (formerly Macocola)
 Mucaba
 Negage
 Puri
 Quimbele
 Quitexe
 Sanza Pombo
 Songo
 Uíge

Communes 
The province of Uíge contains the following communes; sorted by their respective municipalities:

 Alto Cauale Municipality: - Bengo, Caiongo, Cangola
 Ambuila Municipality: – Nova Ambuíla, Quipedro
 Bembe Municipality: – Bembe, Lucunga (Lucanga), Mabaia
 Buengas Municipality: – Buengas, Cuilo-Camboso, Nova Esperança
 Bungo Municipality: – Bungo
 Damba Municipality: – Camatambo, Damba, Lêmboa, Mabanza Sosso (Nsosso), Petecusso
 Maquela do Zombo Municipality: – Beu, Cuilo-Futa, Maquela do Zombo (Zombo), Quibocolo, Sacandica
 Milunga Municipality: – Macocola, Macolo, Massau, Santa Cruz de Milunga
 Mucaba Municipality: – Mucaba, Uando
 Negage Municipality: – Dimuca, Negage, Quisseque
 Puri Municipality: – Puri
 Quimbele Municipality: – Alto Zaza, Cuango, Icoca, Quimbele
 Quitexe Municipality: – Aldeia Viçosa, Cambamba, Quitexe, Vista Alegre
 Sanza Pombo Municipality: – Alfândega, Cuilo Pombo, Sanza Pombo, Uamba
 Songo Municipality: – Kivuenga (Quivuenga), Songo
 Uíge Municipality: – Uíge

Demographics
Uíge has a population 1,426,354. In ethnic terms, its inhabitants are almost exclusively different groups of Bakongo. They speak the Kikongo language.

Economy
The economy of the province is basically of traditional agricultural farming of coffee, beans, cassava, grain, peanuts, cotton, and wood. Plantation and production of coffee contributed largely to the economy of the province and also Angola during colonial times. Coffee production (in Uíge, Luanda, Cuanza Norte and Cuanza Sul provinces of Angola) was started by the Portuguese in 1830s and soon became a cash crop; the popular crop grown was robusta coffee (in its 2000 and odd plantations in Angola, owned mostly by the Portuguese). It was even one of the largest coffee producing country in Africa, in the 1970s. However, the civil war for independence from Portuguese rule devastated the coffee plantations and many coffee agronomists migrated to Brazil and the plantations became wild bushes. However, the rehabilitation of the plantation has started since 2000 but the investment required to replace the 40-year-old unproductive plants are estimated to be US$230 million. With opening up of new roads, industrial activity in the province is taking shape.

Important mineralogical resources which help the economy include copper, silver, and cobalt. Diamonds are also found in the alluvial deposits in the province. The Movoviao –Tetelo-Bembe copper exploration project is located in the province at the border with the Congo Republic. The project has been taken up under a Memorandum of Understanding (MOU) signed in 2008 between Hansa Resources Limited of Canada and Angala Petroleum Services (S.A.R.L). Under this MOU, the Movio copper mine, which was operational between 1937 and 1961 as an open pit and underground mine, is being revived, in addition to the Bembe and Tetelco deposits. Several other minerals, such as cobalt, gold, lead, manganese, silver, vanadium, and zinc, have also been found in this region.

Landmarks
Some of the important monuments in the province are the tomb of Mekabango, and the tomb of king M’Bianda-N Gunga, ruler of the resistance movement.
São José church built in the 18th century is also located near Encope rock outcrop. A fort constructed in the 20th century is also located next to the church.

List of governors

References

Citations

Bibliography

External links
 Official website of province governor
 Information on this province at the Angolan ministry for territorial administration (archived by the Wayback Machine 5th December 2013)
 Information on this province at Info Angola (archived by the Wayback Machine 20th October 2016)
 Province geographical info at geoview.info

 
Provinces of Angola